The Jowett Javelin was an executive car produced from 1947 to 1953 by Jowett Cars Ltd of Idle, near Bradford in England. The model went through five variants coded PA to PE, each having a standard and "de luxe" option. The car was designed by Gerald Palmer during World War II and was intended to be a major leap forward from the relatively staid designs of pre-war Jowetts. Just over 23,000 units were produced.

All steel and new right through
The new Javelin, not yet in full production, made its first public appearance on Saturday 27 July 1946 in a cavalcade to celebrate 60 years of the British Motor Industry organised by the SMMT. Started by the King in Regent's Park the cavalcade passed through Marble Arch around London's West End and Piccadilly Circus and back up to Regent's Park. Series production was not fully under way until November 1947.

In a 1949 road test report The Times''' correspondent welcomed the Javelin's good performance and original design. The engine mounted ahead of the front axle briskly accelerates (to nearly 80 mph) a body which could carry six persons. The moderate size of the engine, the car's light weight and good streamlining all contribute to its excellent performance. Controls were all light to operate and it was a restful car to drive.

Powertrain
The flat four overhead valve engine of 1486 cc with a compression ratio of 7.2:1 was water-cooled and had an aluminium block and wet cylinder liners. Two Zenith carburettors were fitted and PA and PB versions had hydraulic tappets. The radiator was behind the engine. A four-speed gearbox with column change was used. Early cars had gearboxes made by the Henry Meadows company. Later, Jowett made the gearboxes, but the decision to make the gearboxes in-house proved to be a costly mistake. Even though Jowett had some experience in transmission manufacturing, the project went disastrously wrong; powertrainless bodies stacked up in the assembly line because of problems in gearbox production.

Design features
Design features included aerodynamic styling with the headlights faired into the wings and, for the time, a steeply sloped, curved windscreen. The body was of pressed steel, incorporating a box-section chassis, and was made for Jowett by Briggs Motor Bodies in their Doncaster factory. The suspension used torsion-bars on all wheels (independent at the front) and internal gear-and-pinion steering. PA and PB models had mixed Girling hydraulic brakes at the front and mechanical braking at the rear. Later versions were fully hydraulic.

Dimensions
The car was expensive, costing £819 at launch. The Jowett was competing against cars such as the Jaguar 1½ litre (£953), Lanchester LD10 (£927), Riley RM 1½ litre (£863) and the Singer Super 12 (£768).

Performance

The test car cost £1207 including taxes.

Sporting achievements
An early example won in its class at the 1949 Monte Carlo Rally and another won the 2-litre touring-car class at the Spa 24-hour race in the same year. In the 1952 International RAC Rally a Javelin again won its class and also took the "Best Closed Car" award, and in 1953 the International Tulip Rally was won outright by a privately entered Javelin.

Popular culture
 A Javelin features in How to Irritate People sketch "Car Salesman".
In the film Vera Drake, Vera's car is a Javelin.
 In episode 104, "Fallen Angel", of the television series Ballykissangel, Father Clifford inherits a Jowett Javelin. The car was used throughout the rest of Series One and all of Series Two, until it went off a cliff in episode 301 "As Happy As A Turkey On Boxing Day". the car still survives in Co westmeath, a prop was used for the car at bottom of the cliff. 
 The song "Jowett Javelin" appears on the Harvey Andrews album "Snaps" and describes a ride in the automobile.
 A Jowett Javelin is used in the Simple Minds music video for "See the Lights" from the album Real Life''. 
A Javelin appears briefly in the Geraldine Mc Ewan version of Agatha Christie's 4.50 from Paddington.

References

External links

Javelin video
Jowett Car Club Limited Site
Jowett North West Section Site
Photograph of Jowett Javelin

Javelin
Executive cars
Sedans
Cars powered by boxer engines
Cars introduced in 1947
1950s cars